Eikichi (written: 永吉, 栄吉 or 榮吉) is a masculine Japanese given name. Notable people with the name include:

, Japanese businessman and banker
, Imperial Japanese Navy officer
, Chinese sumo wrestler
, Japanese singer-songwriter

Fictional Characters 

 Eikichi Onizuka (鬼塚 英吉), protagonist of the manga and anime series Great Teacher Onizuka
 Eikichi Mishina (三科栄吉), character from the videogame Persona 2: Innocent Sin
Japanese masculine given names